Michael Derrick Tubbs (born August 2, 1990) is an American politician who is currently serving as a special adviser for economic mobility and opportunity for Governor Gavin Newsom. A member of the Democratic Party, he previously served as the 79th mayor of Stockton, California from 2017 to 2021, and as a member of the Stockton City Council from the 6th District from 2013 until 2017.

Tubbs was elected mayor in 2016, becoming the youngest mayor in Stockton's history and its first African-American mayor.

In 2020, he lost reelection to Kevin Lincoln.

Early life
Tubbs was born in south Stockton and grew up in poverty. His mother, Racole Dixon, was a teenager at the time of his birth, and his father, also named Michael Tubbs, is serving a third strike life sentence in prison for kidnapping, drug possession, and robbery. Tubbs has a younger brother named Drevonte.

Education
Tubbs attended Hamilton Middle School. In 2007, while a student at Franklin High School, Tubbs won an essay contest sponsored by Alice Walker. His essay about overcoming the mistakes his parents made was published in the San Francisco Chronicle. He criticized his father's "Scapegoat mentality" and praised his mother for overcoming adversity.

Tubbs graduated with the International Baccalaureate diploma from Franklin High School in 2008. That July, Tubbs was a member of a team of three San Joaquin County teenagers who won a national debate competition in Cincinnati sponsored by the NAACP. They advocated for universal health care, and the debate was followed by a speech by the presidential candidate Barack Obama.

He then attended Stanford University on a need-based scholarship, graduating in 2012 with a Bachelor of Arts in Comparative Studies in Race and Ethnicity and a Master of Arts in Policy, Leadership and Organization Studies. During his time at Stanford, he also served as President of the school's NAACP chapter, and interned at the White House.

Political career

Tubbs announced his candidacy for Stockton Council District 6 for the November 6, 2012 general election, running against incumbent Dale Fritchen. He won the primary and received a $10,000 campaign donation from Oprah Winfrey after meeting her while she toured the Stanford campus.

Tubbs went on to win the election, receiving 61.7% of the vote, and took office in January 2013 at the age of 22, making him the youngest councilmember in Stockton history and one of the youngest elected officials in the United States. His candidacy was also the subject of a documentary, True Son, which premiered at the 2014 Tribeca Film Festival.

Mayor of Stockton, CA
Tubbs announced his candidacy for mayor of Stockton on September 2, 2015, running against incumbent Mayor Anthony Silva in the 2016 general election. He was endorsed by President Barack Obama on November 2, 2016, less than a week before the election. He went on to win the election, receiving 70.6% of the vote and becoming both the city's first black mayor and at 26 the youngest person to hold that office. His term in office began on January 1, 2017.

Tubbs is a proponent of a Universal Basic Income. As part of the privately funded S.E.E.D. pilot project in Stockton, the city provided a $500 stipend to 125 selected residents for an 18-month period with "no strings attached" beginning in February, 2019, thanks to the Economic Security Project, an advocacy group chaired by Facebook co-founder Chris Hughes, which provided the first $1 million for the program, and a dozen other Silicon Valley organizations and private donors who funded the rest of its $3 million budget. Tubbs helped assemble a national coalition of mayors who support UBI, Mayors for a Guaranteed Income, which had more than 60 participating cities by 2022.

During his term, Tubbs also established an intervention program to reduce gun violence, programs to reduce homelessness, and mentorships for at-risk students.

In December 2019, Tubbs endorsed the Democratic presidential campaign of Michael Bloomberg.

Tubbs ran for re-election to a second term as mayor in 2020, eventually losing to Republican Kevin Lincoln. In the first round of mayoral voting, held in June 2020, Tubbs came in first in a field of eight candidates, with 41.5% of the vote (and with Lincoln coming in with 22%). In the runoff election, held November 3, 2020, Tubbs lost to Lincoln 57% to 43%. During the campaign, a social media page known as The 209 Times published numerous stories — many unfounded — accusing Tubbs of corruption. (The 209 Times is run by Motec Patrick Sanchez, who also ran in the June primary election and came in fourth, with 10.5% of the vote.) Some attributed Tubbs's loss to the influence of those The 209 Times stories; however, Tubbs was also opposed by police and firefighters' unions.

Also during his reelection campaign, Tubbs was featured in an HBO documentary, Stockton on My Mind.

Post-mayoral political involvement 
On March 11, 2021, he was appointed by California Governor Gavin Newsom as a special adviser for economic mobility and opportunity. In June 2021, 11 U.S. mayors announced they had formed a coalition, called Mayors Organized for Reparations and Equity, to enact reparations program in their cities; Tubbs was named an emeritus member. In 2022, Tubbs founded a nonprofit organization to address wealth inequities — End Poverty in California (EPIC). As part of his nonprofit work and his duties to the Governor, Tubbs toured California to interview people who are living in poverty. Tubbs has continued to lead Mayors for Guaranteed Income and its expanded organization Counties for Guaranteed Income.

Personal life

In December 2017 Tubbs married Anna Malaika Nti-Asare, whom he met at Stanford University. After graduating from Stanford  with a Bachelor of Arts in medical anthropology in 2014 as a member of Phi Beta Kappa and from King's College, Cambridge with a Master of Philosophy in multidisciplinary gender studies in 2015, Nti-Asare spent two years teaching at Aspire Langston Hughes Academy in Stockton. She is now a Gates Cambridge Scholar and a PhD student in education at King's College, Cambridge.

Tubbs was arrested for driving under the influence in 2014. Tubbs apologized for what he called a "poor decision to drive when I should not have." He pled no contest to misdemeanor charges.

On April 14, 2019, Tubbs announced via Twitter that he and his wife were expecting their first child. On October 19, 2019, he announced the arrival of a son. Their second child, a daughter, was born on August 30, 2021.

In 2022, Tubbs published his memoir, The Deeper the Roots: A Memoir of Hope and Home.

Electoral history

References

External links

Stockton Mayor Michael Tubbs - City of Stockton, CA
KQED radio interview: Stockton's Fast-Rising Mayor Michael Tubbs
Michael Tubbs: The political power of being a good neighbor, TED 2019

1990 births
African-American mayors in California
California city council members
California Democrats
Living people
Mayors of Stockton, California
Stanford University alumni
21st-century African-American people